Pauls Sokolovs (17 July 1902 – 20 April 1971) was a Latvian footballer who competed for Latvia national football team at the 1924 Summer Olympics.

Sokolovs started playing football with JKS Riga in the early years after World War I. In 1923 he joined the newly founded RFK for which he played until the end of his football career. Over the years from 1923 to 1928 Sokolovs won three Latvian Higher League titles and became a two-time winner of the Riga Football Cup. Sokolovs played 8 international matches for Latvia national football team from 1923 to 1925, including a participation at the 1924 Summer Olympics. Sokolovs also played ice hockey and played several matches for Latvia national ice hockey team.

Honours
Latvian Higher League: 1924, 1925, 1926 (RFK)
Riga Football Cup: 1924, 1925 (RFK)

References

External links

1902 births
1971 deaths
Latvian footballers
Latvia international footballers
Footballers at the 1924 Summer Olympics
Olympic footballers of Latvia
Latvian ice hockey players
Association football midfielders